Bog pine is a common name for several trees and may refer to:

Halocarpus bidwillii, native to New Zealand
Pinus uncinata, native to northern Europe